The following is a list of current and former programming broadcast by the TV channel, Cartoon Network.

Current programming

Original series
 The Amazing World of Gumball (October 17, 2011–present)
 We Bare Bears (November 21, 2015–present)
 The Powerpuff Girls (2016) (April 9, 2016–present)
 Ben 10 (2016) (October 1, 2016–present)
 Apple & Onion (2018–present)
 Craig of the Creek (December 1, 2018–present)
 Jellystone!
 Summer Camp Island (July 18, 2019–present)
 Victor and Valentino (September 5, 2019–present)
 Mao Mao: Heroes of Pure Heart (March 10, 2020–present)
 Thundercats Roar
 Tom and Jerry in New York
 Elliott from Earth
 Steven Universe Future
 We Baby Bears

Cartoonito programming
Dino Ranch
Lucas the Spider
Monchhichi Tribe
Mush-Mush and the Mushables

Acquired programming
 Pokémon (2008–present)
 Ninjago (June 15, 2012–present)
 Chi-Ling-Ching: Secret Juju (2012–present)
 Lego Friends (2014–present)
 Hello Carbot (September 15, 2014–present)
 Teen Titans Go! (November 1, 2014–present)
 Mysterious Joker (March 3, 2015–present)
 Beyblade Burst (July 12, 2016–present)
 Grizzy and the Lemmings (October 7, 2016–present), also airs on Boomerang (South Korea).
 Sophie Ruby (October 30, 2016–present)
 Running Man Animation (August 11, 2017–present)
 Dino Mecard (February 19, 2018–present)
 Unikitty! (May 5, 2018–present)
 My Friend, Corey (August 20, 2018–present)
 Tobot V (April 2, 2019–present)
 Sgt. Frog (June 7, 2019–present)
 Mighty Mike (July 4, 2019–present)
 Go! Animal Rescue (July 6, 2019–present)
 Bugsbot Ignition (July 25, 2019–present)
 Butt Detective (August 12, 2019–present)
 Bakugan: Battle Planet (August 22, 2019–present)
 Lego City Adventures (August 24, 2019–present)
 DC Super Hero Girls

Reruns
 Adventure Time (April 8, 2011–present)
 Ben 10: Omniverse (November 2, 2012–present)
 Ben 10: Ultimate Alien (October 10, 2010–present)
 Common Siblings (May 9, 2019–present)
 Turning Mecard  (January 10, 2017–present)

Former programming

Original series
 Courage the Cowardly Dog (November 2017-2020)
 Dexter's Laboratory (November 2006 - 2008)
 Codename: Kids Next Door (November 2006 - 2008)
 The Powerpuff Girls (November 2006 - 2008)
 Ben 10 (December 9, 2006 - 2008)
 My Gym Partner's a Monkey (December 9, 2006 - 2009)
 Robotboy (March 19, 2007 - 2008)
 Foster's Home for Imaginary Friends (April 2007 - 2010)
 Powerpuff Girls Z (2007-2008)
 Camp Lazlo (July 16, 2007 - 2009)
 The Grim Adventures of Billy & Mandy (2008 - 2010)
 Squirrel Boy (2008 - 2009)
 Transformers: Animated (2008)
 Chowder (May 1, 2009 - 2011)
 Ben 10: Alien Force (July 20, 2009 - 2010)
 The Marvelous Misadventures of Flapjack (July 31, 2009 - 2011)
 Hero: 108 (2010–2012)
 Generator Rex (March 6, 2011 - 2013)
 Samurai Jack (2012)
 The Secret Saturdays (2012)
 Regular Show (March 4, 2013 - 2018)
 Johnny Bravo (September 9, 2013 - September 20, 2013)
 Ed, Edd n Eddy (December 13, 2013 - January 24, 2014)
 Mixels (2014–2016)
 Steven Universe (February 14, 2014 - 2019)
 Uncle Grandpa (March 31, 2014 - 2018)
 Clarence (February 6, 2015 - 2019)
 Exchange Student Zero (2016)
 Mighty Magiswords (February 13, 2017 - 2020)
 OK K.O.! Let's Be Heroes (January 1, 2018 - 2020)
 The Heroic Quest of the Valiant Prince Ivandoe (December 25, 2018)

Acquired programming
 Xiaolin Showdown (November 11, 2006 - October 20, 2013)
 Teen Titans (November 11, 2006 - 2010)
 Tom and Jerry (November 2006 - 2009)
 Postman Pat (November 13, 2006 - 2007)
 Petite Princess Yucie (December 2006 - 2007)
 Where on Earth Is Carmen Sandiego? (December 9, 2006 - 2008)
 Olympus Guardian  (2007)
 Nalong 2 (2007)
 Bumper King Zapper (2007)
 Justice League (2007–2008)
 Justice League Unlimited (2007–2008)
 What's New, Scooby-Doo? (2007–2008)
 Mask Man (2007)
 Astro Boy (1980) (2007–2008)
 Pet Alien (2007)
 Artificial Insect Kabuto Borg VxV (2007)
 Z-Squad (June 4, 2007 - September 10, 2007)
 The Batman (July 23, 2007 - 2009)
 Pak Pak Pak Monta (2007)
 The Marshmallow Times (2007)
 Skunk Fu! (October 9, 2007 - 2008)
 Fantastic Four: World's Greatest Heroes (November 5, 2007 - 2008)
 Tai Chi Chasers (November 19, 2007 - 2008)
 Tom and Jerry Tales (November 23, 2007 - 2010)
 The New Woody Woodpecker Show (December 17, 2007 - 2008)
 Giga Tribe (2008–2009)
 Kamichama Karin (2008)
 Kirarin Revolution (Season 2) (September 1, 2008 - 2009)
 Ruby Gloom (2008)
 Wan Wan Celeb Soreyuke! Tetsunoshin (2008–2009)
 Storm Hawks (2008–2009)
 Batman: The Brave and the Bold (November 7, 2009 - 2011)
 Onegai My Melody (2009–2012)
 Futari wa Pretty Cure Splash Star (2009)
 Beyblade: Metal Fusion (2009–2011)
 Kid vs. Kat (2009 - 2012)
 Akazukin Chacha (March 2, 2010 - 2011)
 The Monster Kid (April 28, 2010 - 2011)
 Kiteretsu Daihyakka (May 10, 2010 - February 6, 2014)
 Mix Master: Final Force (July 26, 2010 - March 21, 2011)
 Scan2Go (November 15, 2010 - April 1, 2011)
 Ninja Hattori-kun (December 13, 2010 - October 19, 2012)
 Mighty Cat Masked Niyander (2010–2012 - May 6, 2013 - May 20, 2013)
 Tobot (2010 - December 14, 2015)
 The Super Hero Squad Show (2010–2012)
 Ultimate Muscle II (2010–2011)
 Bolts and Blip (January 19, 2011 - April 21, 2011)
 Little Battlers Experience (September 19, 2011 - May 15, 2014)
 Sidekick (2011–2012)
 Jewelpet (2011–2012)
 Jimmy Two-Shoes (2011–2012)
 Cardfight!! Vanguard (2011–2012)
 Tayo the Little Bus (January 21, 2012 - March 3, 2012)
 Cardcaptors (February 15, 2012 - October 16, 2012)
 Toriko (March 14, 2012 - August 25, 2014)
 The Beeps (2007-2018)
 Osomatsu-kun (July 25, 2012 - August 8, 2013)
 Robot Arpo (September 24, 2012 - November 13, 2012)
 The Looney Tunes Show (2012 - March 19, 2014)
 DreamWorks Dragons (January 3, 2013 - October 11, 2014)
 Kodocha (March 9, 2013 - 2014)
 Magi: The Labyrinth of Magic (April 8, 2013 - May 20, 2013)
 Legends of Chima (May 1, 2013 - February 5, 2015)
 Fish 'n Chips (May 6, 2013 - June 12, 2013)
 Pretty Rhythm: Aurora Dream (September 7, 2013 - March 15, 2014)
 ThunderCats (2011) (October 5, 2013 - January 25, 2014)
 Frankie and Friends (March 3, 2014 - April 10, 2014)
 Dooly the Little Dinosaur (2009) (May 12, 2014 - June 23, 2014)
 Gundam Build Fighters (July 30, 2014 - October 22, 2014)
 Tori Gogo (September 17, 2014 - October 2, 2014)
 Barbie: Life in the Dreamhouse (September 22, 2014 - 2014)
 Hero Bank (October 6, 2014 - December 27, 2015)
 Detective Story (November 24, 2014 - November 25, 2014 – 2015–2018)
 Gundam Build Fighters Try (March 27, 2015 - September 11, 2015)
 Inspector Gadget (2015) (June 2, 2015 - July 2, 2019) also airs on Boomerang (South Korea).
 Turbo Fast (September 10, 2015 - January 1, 2017)
 Iron Man (September 11, 2015 - September 16, 2015)
 Spookiz (September 17, 2015 - October 2, 2015)
 Robotex (2015–2016)
 Sonic Boom (October 12, 2015 - November 30, 2015) also airs on Boomerang (South Korea).
 Zombiedumb (January 11, 2016 - October 9, 2016)
 B-Daman Fireblast (January 18, 2016 - April 12, 2016)
 Nexo Knights (March 4, 2016 - September 24, 2017)
 Turning Mecard (March 15, 2016 - April 12, 2016)
 Athlon Tobot (April 1, 2016 - May 18, 2017)
 Mr. Bean: The Animated Series (Season 4) (April 4, 2016 - July 23, 2016) also airs on Boomerang (South Korea).
 Yu-Gi-Oh! Duel Monsters (May 12, 2016 - July 28, 2016)
 Be Cool, Scooby-Doo! (July 14, 2016 - February 24, 2017) also airs on Boomerang (South Korea).
 Mini Force (July 18, 2016 - December 9, 2016)
 Larva (July 18, 2016 - August 15, 2016)
 Power Battle Watch Car (September 10, 2016 - September 11, 2016)
 Kamiwaza Wanda (September 12, 2016 - May 21, 2017)
 PriPara (September 19, 2016 - November 11, 2016)
 My Little Pony: Friendship is Magic (October 8, 2016 - January 1, 2017) moved to Tooniverse.
 Kamisama Minarai: Himitsu no Cocotama (November 5, 2016 - October 27, 2017)
 Total Drama (December 30, 2016 - December 31, 2016)
 Capsule Boy (February 5, 2017 - July 2, 2017)
 Geomeca (March 14, 2017 - February 21, 2018)
 Yu-Gi-Oh! Arc-V (April 10, 2017 - July 11, 2017)
 Horrid Henry (April 22, 2017 - April 30, 2017)
 Total Drama Presents: The Ridonculous Race (May 27, 2017 - May 28, 2017)
 Kong Soon Yi (June 3, 2017 - June 19, 2017)
 Justice League Action (June 11, 2017 - June 11, 2017)
 Dino Core (Season 3) (October 20, 2017 - January 12, 2018)
 Turning Mecard R (November 10, 2017 - May 4, 2018)
 The Sound of Heart (January 27, 2018 - February 18, 2018)
 Johnny Test (July 21, 2018 - March 2019)
 Snack World (July 21, 2018 - May 25, 2019)
 Lip Changer (October 6, 2018 - November 17, 2018)
 Gundam Build Divers (January 12, 2019 - April 6, 2019)
 Barbie Dreamhouse Adventures (March 9, 2019 - June 2, 2019)

Upcoming programming

Acquired programming
 Talking Tom & Friends (April 2023–present)
 Pucca: Love Recipe (April 2023–present)
 Boy Girl Dog Cat Mouse Cheese (April 2023–present)
 Lego Monkie Kid (April 2023–present)
 Shaun the Sheep (June 2023–present)
 Timmy Time (June 2023–present)
 Maca & Roni (June 2023–present)
 Jungle Box (June 2023–present)
 Pat the Dog (July 2023–present)
 Pororo the Little Penguin (July 2023–present)
Jessica's Big Little World  (2023-present)

References

South Korean television-related lists
Cartoon Network-related lists